The Via6 Towers are a pair of 24-story apartment buildings in the Belltown neighborhood of Seattle, Washington. Construction began in 2011 and the building topped out in June 2012. The complex opened February 2013 and includes 18,000 square feet of retail space at street level. The building was constructed to Leed Gold standards.

References

External links

Official website at Pine Street Group

Residential skyscrapers in Seattle
Belltown, Seattle